The University of Nouakchott Al Aasriya is a university in the city of Nouakchott, capital of Mauritania.

History 
The university was created in July 2016 from the merger of the University of Science, Technology and Medicine and the University of Nouakchott, that was established in 1981 and has more than 12,000 students.

References

External links

 University of Nouakchott website
 Presidency of the University
 University Website

Educational institutions established in 1981
Universities in Mauritania
Nouakchott